Felicity Barringer (born 1950, Philadelphia) is an American journalist.  She is a writer in residence at Stanford University.

Life 
She graduated from Shipley School, and Stanford University. She wrote for The Bergen Record, and The Washington Post, From 1985 to 1988, she was Moscow correspondent for The New York Times. She was United Nations bureau chief  She was environmental correspondent for the New York Times.

Family 
She married Phil Taubman.

Works 

 Flight From Sorrow, The Life and Death of Tamara Well Atheneum; 1984.

References

External links 
 

The Washington Post people
Stanford University alumni
The New York Times people
1951 births
Journalists from Pennsylvania
People from Philadelphia
Living people